The 2022 Uruguay Open was a professional tennis tournament played on red clay courts in Montevideo. It was the 17th edition of the tournament which was part of the 2022 ATP Challenger Tour. It took place at the Carrasco Lawn Tennis Club in Montevideo, Uruguay between 7 and 13 November 2022.

Singles main-draw entrants

Seeds

 1 Rankings are as of 31 October 2022.

Other entrants
The following players received wildcards into the singles main draw:
  Leo Borg
  Guido Pella
  Franco Roncadelli

The following player received entry into the singles main draw using a protected ranking:
  Sumit Nagal

The following players received entry into the singles main draw as alternates:
  Nikola Milojević
  Genaro Alberto Olivieri

The following players received entry from the qualifying draw:
  Jan Choinski
  Moez Echargui
  Max Houkes
  Juan Pablo Paz
  Eduardo Ribeiro
  Federico Zeballos

The following player received entry as a lucky loser:
  Gonzalo Villanueva

Champions

Singles

  Genaro Alberto Olivieri def.  Tomás Martín Etcheverry 6–7(3–7), 7–6(7–5), 6–3.

Doubles

  Karol Drzewiecki /  Piotr Matuszewski def.  Facundo Díaz Acosta /  Luis David Martínez 6–4, 6–4.

References

2022 ATP Challenger Tour
2022
November 2022 sports events in Uruguay